Julius Jones is an American former Negro league outfielder who played between 1938 and 1940. 

Jones made his Negro leagues debut in 1938 with the Memphis Red Sox. He went on to play for the Birmingham Black Barons in 1940.

References

External links
 and Seamheads 

Year of birth missing
Place of birth missing
Birmingham Black Barons players
Memphis Red Sox players
Baseball outfielders